Usman Salahuddin (born 2 December 1990) is a Pakistani international cricketer who was selected to play against the West Indies for the May 2011 series. Salahuddin averages 36 in List A cricket and 47 in First-class cricket. He represented Lahore Eagles team in Faysal Bank T20 Cup 2012–13 season.

2016 season he was signed by Newcastle city cricket club as their pro. In April 2017, he was added to Pakistan's Test squad for their series against the West Indies, but he did not play. He regained his place for the Test series against Sri Lanka played in September and October 2017, but again, did not play.

In April 2018, he was named in Pakistan's Test squad for their tours to Ireland and England in May 2018. He made his Test debut against England on 1 June 2018. In August 2018, he was one of thirty-three players to be awarded a central contract for the 2018–19 season by the Pakistan Cricket Board (PCB).

In September 2019, he was named in Central Punjab's squad for the 2019–20 Quaid-e-Azam Trophy tournament. In December 2020, during the 2020–21 Quaid-e-Azam Trophy, Salahuddin scored his maiden double century in first-class cricket, with an unbeaten 219. In January 2021, he was named in Central Punjab's squad for the 2020–21 Pakistan Cup. In October 2021, he was named in the Pakistan Shaheens squad for their tour of Sri Lanka.

References

External links

1990 births
Living people
Cricketers from Lahore
Pakistani cricketers
Pakistan Test cricketers
Pakistan One Day International cricketers
Sui Northern Gas Pipelines Limited cricketers
Habib Bank Limited cricketers
Lahore Eagles cricketers
Punjab (Pakistan) cricketers
Central Punjab cricketers
People from Lahore